Paulo Francisco Joazeiro de Abreu (Sú) (3 December 1965 – 26 July 2015) was a Brazilian water polo player. He competed in the 1984 Summer Olympics. He died of heart problems.

References

1965 births
Living people
Water polo players at the 1984 Summer Olympics
Brazilian male water polo players
Olympic water polo players of Brazil
Water polo players from Rio de Janeiro (city)